Alexei Yevgenyevich Urmanov (born 17 November 1973) is a Russian figure skating coach and former competitor. He is the 1994 Olympic champion, the 1993 World bronze medalist, the 1997 European champion, the 1995–96 Champions Series Final champion, a four-time Russian national champion, and the 1992 Soviet national champion.

Personal life 
Urmanov was born on 17 November 1973 in Leningrad, Soviet Union. In 2001, his partner, Viktoria, gave birth to twins, Ivan and Andrei. The couple married in 2004.

Career 
Urmanov started skating in 1977. Early in his career, he was coached by N. Monakhova and Natalia Golubeva.

Competing for the Soviet Union, Urmanov won the silver medal at the 1990 World Junior Championships. After the end of the Soviet Union, he chose to compete for Russia. In 1991, at age 17, he landed a quadruple jump at the European Championships.

Urmanov competed at the 1992 Winter Olympics, where he placed 5th. He won the bronze medal at the 1993 World Championships. At the 1994 Winter Olympics in Lillehammer, he won the gold medal, becoming one of the youngest male figure skating Olympic champions.

Urmanov chose to remain in the competitive ranks. He became the 1997 European champion, but an injury forced him out of the 1997 World Championships after the short program and kept him from competing for a berth to the 1998 Olympics. He retired from Olympic-eligible skating in 1999 and won the World Professional Championships the same year. Urmanov was coached by Alexei Mishin at the Yubileyny Sports Palace in Saint Petersburg. During the 1990s, the rink often had poor-quality ice and other problems, resulting in limited training time.

Urmanov is an Honoured Masters of Sports of the Russian Federation. He works as a skating coach and an International Skating Union technical specialist. His former students include Sergei Voronov, Nodari Maisuradze, Zhan Bush, Gordei Gorshkov, Nikol Gosviani, Polina Agafonova, Anastasiia Gubanova, Deniss Vasiļjevs and Yulia Lipnitskaya.  He was based in Saint Petersburg until 2014, when he moved to Sochi, to coach at the Iceberg Skating Palace. He sometimes holds summer camps or clinics in other locations such as Luleå, Sweden, and Paris, France.

Programs

Competitive highlights
GP: Champions Series / Grand Prix

References

External links

Navigation

Russian male single skaters
Soviet male single skaters
Olympic figure skaters of Russia
Olympic figure skaters of the Unified Team
Olympic gold medalists for Russia
Figure skaters at the 1992 Winter Olympics
Figure skaters at the 1994 Winter Olympics
International Skating Union technical specialists
Russian figure skating coaches
1973 births
Living people
Figure skaters from Saint Petersburg
Olympic medalists in figure skating
World Figure Skating Championships medalists
European Figure Skating Championships medalists
World Junior Figure Skating Championships medalists
Medalists at the 1994 Winter Olympics
Goodwill Games medalists in figure skating
Competitors at the 1994 Goodwill Games